Qusha Bolagh or Qowsha Bolagh may refer to:
 Qusha Bolagh, East Azerbaijan
 Qusha Bolagh, West Azerbaijan
 Qusha Bolagh-e Olya, West Azerbaijan Province
 Qusha Bolagh-e Sofla, West Azerbaijan Province